The Wonderful Ice Cream Suit and Other Plays (1972) is a collection of three plays by Ray Bradbury: The Wonderful Ice Cream Suit, The Veldt, and To the Chicago Abyss. All are adaptations of his short stories by the same names.  The play The Wonderful Ice Cream Suit was adapted into a 1998 film by Touchstone Pictures.

External links
 
 

1972 books
1972 plays
Plays by Ray Bradbury
Books of plays